The Norpatagonico Open, or Abierto Norpatagónico,  is one of the major professional golf tournaments in Argentina. Founded in 1969, it has always been held at the Palihue Golf Club in Bahía Blanca, Buenos Aires Province, although it was not played between 1974 and 1986.

The tournament currently forms part of the PGA Tour Latinoamérica Developmental Series.

Winners

* 1995 championship reduced to 54 holes

References

External links
TPG Tour - official site
Palihue Golf Club - official site

Golf tournaments in Argentina